Izbăşeşti may refer to several villages in Romania:

 A village in the Stolnici commune, Argeș County
 Castra of Izbășești, an earthen fort in the Roman province of Dacia
 A village in Milcoiu Commune, Vâlcea County

See also 
 Izbașa (disambiguation)